The Shapley Kittiwake is a 1930s British two-seat gull wing monoplane designed and built by Errol Spencer Shapley at Torquay, Devon.

Development
The Kittiwake was a monoplane with a gull wing and a fixed landing gear. The first aircraft, a Mark 1 registered G-AEZN, with a single-seat open cockpit was powered by a 50 hp (37 kW) Continental A50 piston engine and first flown at Roborough in June 1937, but was damaged in a crash landing later that year. The second aircraft, a Mark 2 registered G-AFRP, was a larger two-seat cabin monoplane powered by a 90 hp (67 kW) Pobjoy Niagara III engine and first flown at Roborough in 1938.

The Mark 1 aircraft was dismantled before the Second World War. The Mark 2 was stored during the war only to crash on Dartmoor in December 1946.

Specifications (Mark 2)

References

Notes

Bibliography

1930s British civil utility aircraft
Gull-wing aircraft
Aircraft first flown in 1937